Empress Wang (1084–1108) was a Chinese empress consort of the Song Dynasty, married to Emperor Huizong of Song.

Wang came from the capital, and her father served as prefect. She was selected to be the primary consort of Prince Huizeng by his legal mother Dowager Empress Xiang in 1099. After the wedding, the Empress Dowager gave two concubines, Consort Zheng and Consort Wang, to prince Huizeng. When Huizeng succeeded his brother as emperor in 1100, Wang became his empress.

Empress Wang gave birth to a daughter in 1101, but had no more children after that. Wang played no dominant part and emperor Huizeng was reportedly indifferent to her.

Notes

1108 deaths
Song dynasty empresses
1084 births
11th-century Chinese women
11th-century Chinese people
12th-century Chinese women
12th-century Chinese people